Schistura nagodiensis, sometimes known as the Nagodi loach, is a species of freshwater fish in the family Nemacheilidae. It is endemic to the Sharavathi River basin in the central Western Ghats, India, where it is known from Nagodihole, its type locality. It grows to  standard length.

References

N
Fish described in 2006
Freshwater fish of India
Endemic fauna of the Western Ghats